Saint-Bauzile is the name of two communes in France:

 Saint-Bauzile, Ardèche
 Saint-Bauzile, Lozère

See also 
 Saint-Bauzille (disambiguation)
 Saint-Beauzile